Josef Schulz (11 April 1840, Prague – 15 July 1917, Špindlerův Mlýn) was a Czech architect, designer, teacher and restorer.

Life and work 
His father, Jan Schulz, was a wealthy merchant, originally from Hrdlív. He began studying architecture at Prague Polytechnic (1857–1861), then transferred to the Academy of Fine Arts, Vienna, where he worked in the studios of Eduard van der Nüll and August Sicard von Sicardsburg; graduating in 1865. He also served as an assistant to the architect, Josef Zítek, from 1864 to 1868. He completed his studies with a two-year trip to Italy, from 1868 to 1870. 

After returning to Prague in 1871, he worked as an independent architect and invested in real estate; becoming the co-owner of several homes. His own home was in Old Town. He was completely devoted to his work and kept his widowed sister, Antonia, as his housekeeper.

In 1874, he began teaching at the Vocational School, creating designs for jewelry and haberdashery, which were then produced by his students. In 1878, he was appointed a full Professor at the Polytechnic and became a member of the Royal Bohemian Society of Sciences. Some of his lectures were published as articles in professional journals, such as Architektonický obzor.

His architectural designs included decorative elements, as well as furniture, lighting, and other interior equipment. Often, he would collaborate with the sculptor, Bohuslav Schnirch, for external decorations. From 1881 to 1883, he oversaw the restoration of the National Theatre, which had been heavily damaged by a fire a few months after it opened. Together with his former teacher, Zítek, he worked on the design and construction of the Rudolfinum, which opened in 1885. Later, he was the sole designer for the National Museum, built from 1885 to 1891, and the Museum of Decorative Arts, built from 1898 to 1901.

In 1911, the Czech Technical University (formerly the Polytechnic) awarded him the honorary title, Doctor of Technical Sciences.

Sources 
 Karel B. Mádl: "Josef Schulz" (obituary) in: Národní listy, August 1917
 Anděla Horová (Ed.), Nová encyklopedie českého výtvarného umění, Vol. II. N–Ž, Academia Praha 1993, p. 740 
 Ferdinand Seibt, Hans Lemberg, Helmut Slapnicka: Biographisches Lexikon zur Geschichte der böhmischen Länder, Collegium Carolinum, Vol. III, R. Oldenbourg Verlag, 2000, p. 787

External links 

 
 Works by and about Schulz @ the National Library of the Czech Republic

1840 births
1917 deaths
Czech architects
Architectural designers
Academy of Fine Arts Vienna alumni
Architects from Prague